Geraldton is the central suburb of the City of Greater Geraldton in the Mid West region of Western Australia.

Demographics
The median age of persons in Golden Gully was 47 years. There were less males than females, with 47.2% of the population male and 52.8% female. The average household size was 2 people per household.

References

Suburbs of Geraldton